John Shaw (born 1944) is an American nature photographer who is well known for his instructional books.  In 1997, he received the inaugural Outstanding Photographer Award from North American Nature Photography Association (NANPA). In 2002, Nikon featured him as "Legend Behind the Lens".

References

External links

Nature photographers
1944 births
Living people